Rabindranath Salazar Solorio (born 2 June 1968) is a Mexican politician affiliated with the PRD. He currently serves as Senator of the LXII Legislature of the Mexican Congress representing Morelos.

References

1968 births
Living people
People from Jiutepec
Members of the Senate of the Republic (Mexico)
Party of the Democratic Revolution politicians
21st-century Mexican politicians
Municipal presidents in Morelos
Universidad Autónoma del Estado de Morelos alumni
Members of the Congress of Morelos
Senators of the LXII and LXIII Legislatures of Mexico